The Chevrolet Detroit Grand Prix presented by Lear Corporation was the lone doubleheader event of the 2017 IndyCar Series season, consisting of the 7th and 8th rounds of the championship. The event was held at the Raceway at Belle Isle in Detroit, Michigan. Graham Rahal dominated the weekend, leading the most laps and winning both races.

Race 1 – Saturday, June 3

Qualifying
Qualifying for race one was held in the morning of June 3. Due to time constraints, the session consisted of only what would be round 1 of a normal IndyCar qualifying session. Initially, it appeared that Hélio Castroneves qualified first, but was ruled to have failed to slow for a yellow flag, resulting in his fastest time being disallowed. As such, Graham Rahal inherited the pole position with a new track-record time of 1:13.9681 at an average speed of 114.37 mph (184.07 km/h). Castroneves still started second, as his second fastest lap still put him the fastest of his group. Takuma Sato, fresh off his Indy 500 victory, qualified third, with his teammate Alexander Rossi fourth. James Hinchcliffe rounded out the top five.

Race
The race was held later that afternoon. The start saw Graham Rahal hold the lead over Hélio Castroneves after the first turns. Behind them, James Hinchcliffe lost control of his car in turn 1 and spun, bringing out the race's first caution period. Hinchcliffe was able to avoid contact with anything during the incident and continue on in the race. Racing resumed on lap 5, with the running order remaining roughly the same. Around lap 10, drivers attempting to use a three-stop strategy during the race began to pit, including Castroneves, Josef Newgarden, and Takuma Sato. Those attempting a two-stop strategy began their stops at roughly lap 20, including Rahal, Alexander Rossi, and Scott Dixon. After the pit cycle was complete, Castroneves and Newgarden had inherited the first two spots, with Rahal on his two-stop strategy some six seconds adrift.

On lap 25, caution flew for the second and final time when Conor Daly's car lost power in turn 3 directly in front of Charlie Kimball, causing the two to make contact and causing damage to Kimball's to front wing. Kimball was able to continue on and get repairs to the damage, but Daly's car ground to a halt and was unable to be restarted, making him the race's only retirement. During the caution, Newgarden elected to make his second stop, the only front-runner to do so during the period. The top five became Castroneves, Rahal, Takuma Sato, Rossi, and Hinchcliffe, who had finally managed to recover from his first lap spin.

Racing resumed on lap 31 with the leaders staying in order. Five laps later, Castroneves pitted for the second time, moving Rahal back into the lead of the race. Sato pitted shortly thereafter, moving Rossi to second and Hinchcliffe to third. Those on two-stop strategies began to pit just after lap 45 for their final stops. After the cycle, Rahal held the lead over Castroneves, though Castroneves made his final stop shortly thereafter, moving Scott Dixon into second place, while James Hinchcliffe held third. This order would stay the same for the remainder of the race, as Rahal crossed the line just over six seconds ahead of Dixon. Hinchcliffe managed to just stave off a hard charging Josef Newgarden, while Alexander Rossi held rounded out the top five.

Rahal's victory made him the seventh driver in seven races to win during the 2017 IndyCar Series season. For Rahal, it was his fifth career victory and his first on a street circuit since his first win at St. Petersburg in 2008.

Results

Qualifying

Race

Notes:
 Points include 1 point for leading at least 1 lap during a race, an additional 2 points for leading the most race laps. For Detroit only, 1 bonus point was awarded to the fastest qualifier from both groups.

Source for time gaps:

Championship standings 

Driver standings

 Note: Only the top five positions are included.

Race 2 – Sunday, June 4

Qualifying
Qualifying for Race 2 was held the morning of June 4, with the same qualifying format as the previous day. Takuma Sato broke the track record that Graham Rahal had set the previous day with a time of 1:13.6732, putting him on pole position. His Andretti Autosport teammate Ryan Hunter-Reay qualified second, while Rahal was third. The top five was rounded out by Hélio Castroneves and James Hinchcliffe. The first group lost a significant amount of their session after Carlos Muñoz crashed into the turn 2 wall.

Race
The race was held later that afternoon. At the start, Takuma Sato held the lead, with the top five starters remaining in order. Unlike the previous day, the field made it through the first two corners without incident. The leaders stayed mainly the same for the first 10 laps, though James Hinchcliffe elected to pit on lap 6. However, he was hit deemed to have been too fast on pit-lane and was hit with a drive-through penalty, beginning what was a bad day for the team. On lap 10, Graham Rahal managed to pass Ryan Hunter-Reay, moving him up to second. Around the same time, those attempting a three-stop strategy for the race began pitting, including Scott Dixon and Josef Newgarden. Dixon, however, lost a large amount of time due to a fueling issue, dropping him down to 18th. Hélio Castroneves and Hunter-Reay were both forced onto the three-stop strategy after the two made contact when Castroneves attempted a pass, resulting in Castroneves having a tire go flat and Hunter-Reay suffering front wing damage. They emerged from their stops 18th and 19th respectively. After this, the front runners were Sato, Rahal, and Will Power, who had greatly benefited from the Castroneves/Hunter-Reay incident.

At lap 22, stops for those going for a two-stop strategy began, as Sato, Rahal, Power, Simon Pagenaud, and Alexander Rossi all pitted within about 3 laps of this. The stops allowed Rahal to overtake Sato by a margin of 4 seconds, while Dixon managed to move into third, though needed two more stops. The race lead, however, was held by Josef Newgarden on his three-stop strategy, who was actually gaining time on Rahal. However, on lap 29, he, along with Dixon, pitted for the second time, moving Rahal into the lead of the race. Newgarden emerged fifth, while Dixon emerged 10th. The running order was now Rahal, Sato, Power, Pagenaud.

On lap 35, a minor incident occurred when J. R. Hildebrand and Ed Jones made contact, damaging their cars, though no caution came out. At roughly lap 45, the final stops for nearly everyone began, with Rahal maintaining his position. Power was able to move around Sato, but his teammate Newgarden's three-stop strategy had worked well and moved him past Power for second. Newgarden then began trying to catch Rahal.

On lap 66, with the race in its closing laps, caution waved when James Hinchcliffe came to a halt in turn 2. At the same time, Spencer Pigot's engine let go, bringing an end to his race as well. IndyCar officials elected to red flag the race for clean-up to allow for a green flag finish. Racing was resumed with 2 laps to go, but despite the field being bunched up, the top five did not change. Graham Rahal completed his domination of the weekend, winning by just over a second over Josef Newgarden. In doing so, Rahal became the first driver to sweep the doubleheader weekend at Detroit. It also marked the first time in his career that Rahal won consecutive races. Finally, Rahal became the first driver during the 2017 IndyCar Series season to win a second race.

Scott Dixon moved into the points lead after a strong finish in both races, while Hélio Castroneves dropped to second. Rahal's dominant weekend moved him into sixth.

Results

Qualifying

Race

Notes:
 Points include 1 point for leading at least 1 lap during a race, an additional 2 points for leading the most race laps. For Detroit only, 1 bonus point was awarded to the fastest qualifier from both groups.

Source for time gaps:

Championship standings

Driver standings

Manufacturer standings

 Note: Only the top five positions are included.

References

Chevrolet Detroit Grand Prix
2017 Chevrolet Detroit Grand Prix
Detroit Indy Grand Prix
Chevrolet Detroit Grand Prix
2017 in Detroit